The General Intelligence Office is the internal intelligence agency of Venezuela.

According to the New York Times, as of June 3, 2008, this agency replaced the Dirección de los Servicios de Inteligencia y Prevención; however this appears to be incorrect.

See also
 Dirección de los Servicios de Inteligencia y Prevención

References

Secret police
Venezuelan intelligence agencies